A general election was held in the U.S. state of Michigan on November 4, 2014. Primary elections were held on August 5, 2014.

Voters elected all four executive officers and both houses of the state legislature, as well as the state's delegations to the U.S. House and one of its two U.S. Senate seats.

As of 2022, this remains the last time that the Republican Party has won any statewide office in Michigan.

Federal elections

U.S. Senate 

Incumbent Democratic Senator Carl Levin was re-elected in 2008 with 62.7% of the vote. He retired instead of seeking a seventh term. U.S. Representative Gary Peters defeated former Secretary of State Terri Lynn Land in the general election.

U.S. House

State elections

Governor and Lieutenant Governor 

Incumbent Republican Governor Rick Snyder was first elected in 2010 with 58.1% of the vote. He ran for re-election to a second term and defeated former U.S. Representative Mark Schauer in the closest statewide election in 2014.

Secretary of State 

Incumbent Republican Secretary of State Ruth Johnson was first elected in 2010 with 50.7% of the vote. She won re-election to a second term against attorney Godfrey Dillard.

Attorney General 

Incumbent Republican Attorney General Bill Schuette was first elected in 2010 with 52.6% of the vote. He won re-election to a second term against MSU law professor Mark Totten.

Board of Education

State Legislature 

All seats of the Michigan Legislature were up for election. The Senate elects its members to four year terms, while the House of Representatives members are elected to two year terms. Republicans retained control of both chambers and made small gains in seats.

Supreme Court

General election

Special election

Ballot measures

Proposal 1

See also 
 Elections in Michigan
 2014 United States elections

References 

 
Michigan
Michigan elections by year